USS Adirondack may refer to:

 , was a gunboat during the American Civil War that sank off the Bahamas
 , was an iron-hulled screw tugboat originally known as Underwriter.
 , was commissioned into the Navy in 1917 and used as a floating barracks until 1919.
 , was an amphibious force flagship in service from 1945 to 1955.

United States Navy ship names